Žiberci is a village in the Municipality of Apače in northeastern Slovenia.

There is a 19th-century two-storey belfry in the village.

References

External links 
Žiberci on Geopedia

Populated places in the Municipality of Apače